Shade gardens are a type of garden planted and grown in areas with little or no direct sunlight. Shade gardens may occur naturally or by design under trees, as well as on the side of buildings or fences. This style of garden presents certain challenges, in part because only certain plants are able to grow in shady conditions and otherwise there is direct competition for sunlight. Very few edible plants grow well in shady conditions, so shade gardens are usually ornamental gardens, though growing flowers may also be difficult in shade. Light shade, also known as "dappled sunlight", may support growing herbs or some leaf vegetables, but in addition to lack of light, trees and other large plants which create shade gardens may negatively impact soil fertility.

See also
 List of garden types

References

 

Garden features
Types of garden